Marty Moore (born March 19, 1971) is a former professional American football linebacker who played eight seasons in the National Football League (NFL) for the New England Patriots and Cleveland Browns.  Moore was the first Mr. Irrelevant ever to play in a Super Bowl (Super Bowl XXXI). He also became the first Mr. Irrelevant to win a Super Bowl (Super Bowl XXXVI). 

Moore played high school football for Highlands High in Fort Thomas, Kentucky and college football at the University of Kentucky, playing in the 1993 Peach Bowl and becoming the final pick in the 1994 NFL Draft after his senior season.

References

1971 births
American football linebackers
Kentucky Wildcats football players
New England Patriots players
Cleveland Browns players
Living people
Highlands High School (Fort Thomas, Kentucky) alumni
Players of American football from Phoenix, Arizona